Simon Conway Morris  (born 1951) is an English palaeontologist, evolutionary biologist, and astrobiologist known for his study of the fossils of the Burgess Shale and the Cambrian explosion. The results of these discoveries were celebrated in Stephen Jay Gould's 1989 book Wonderful Life. Conway Morris's own book on the subject, The Crucible of Creation (1998), however, is critical of Gould's presentation and interpretation.

Conway Morris, a Christian, holds to theistic views of biological evolution. He has held the Chair of Evolutionary Palaeobiology in the Department of Earth Sciences, University of Cambridge since 1995.

Biography

Early years
Conway Morris was born on 6 November 1951. A native of Carshalton, Surrey, he was brought up in London, England. and went on to study geology at Bristol University, achieving a First Class Honours degree. He then moved to Cambridge University and completed a PhD at St John's College under Harry Blackmore Whittington. He is professor of evolutionary palaeobiology in the Department of Earth Sciences at Cambridge. He is renowned for his insights into early evolution and his studies of paleobiology. He gave the Royal Institution Christmas Lecture in 1996 on the subject of The History in our Bones. He was elected a Fellow of the Royal Society at age 39, was awarded the Walcott Medal of the National Academy of Sciences in 1987 and the Lyell Medal of the Geological Society of London in 1998.

Work
Conway Morris is based in the Department of Earth Sciences at the University of Cambridge and is best known for his work on the Cambrian explosion, the Burgess Shale fossil fauna and similar deposits in China and Greenland. In addition to working in these countries he has undertaken research in Australia, Canada, Mongolia and the United States. His studies on the Burgess Shale-type faunas, as well as the early evolution of skeletons, has encompassed a wide variety of groups, ranging from ctenophores to the earliest vertebrates. His thinking on the significance of the Burgess Shale has evolved and his current interest in evolutionary convergence and its wider significance – the topic of his 2007 Gifford Lectures – was in part spurred by Stephen Jay Gould's arguments for the importance of contingency in the history of life.

In January 2017 his team announced the discovery of an early ancestor of vertebrates, a bag-like sea creature, which lived about 540 million years ago.

Burgess Shale
Conway Morris' views on the Burgess Shale are reported in numerous technical papers and more generally in The Crucible of Creation (Oxford University Press, 1998). In recent years he has been investigating the phenomenon of evolutionary convergence, the main thesis of which is put forward in Life's Solution: Inevitable Humans in a Lonely Universe (Cambridge University Press, 2003). He is now involved on a major project to investigate both the scientific ramifications of convergence and also to establish a website (www.mapoflife.org) that aims to provide an easily accessible introduction to the thousands of known examples of convergence. This work is funded by the John Templeton Foundation.

Evolution, science and religion
Conway Morris is active in the public understanding of science and has broadcast extensively on radio and television. The latter includes the Royal Institution Christmas Lectures delivered in 1996. A Christian, he has participated in science and religion debates, including arguments against intelligent design on the one hand and materialism on the other. In 2005 he gave the second Boyle Lecture. He has lectured at the Faraday Institute for Science and Religion on "Evolution and fine-tuning in Biology". He gave the University of Edinburgh Gifford Lectures for 2007 in a series titled "Darwin's Compass: How Evolution Discovers the Song of Creation". In these lectures Conway Morris makes several claims that evolution is compatible with belief in the existence of a God.

He is a critic of materialism and of reductionism:

That satisfactory definitions of life elude us may be one hint that when materialists step forward and declare with a brisk slap of the hands that this is it, we should be deeply skeptical. Whether the "it" be that of Richard Dawkins' reductionist gene-centred worldpicture, the "universal acid" of Daniel Dennett's meaningless Darwinism, or David Sloan Wilson's faith in group selection (not least to explain the role of human religions), we certainly need to acknowledge each provides insights but as total explanations of what we see around us they are, to put it politely, somewhat incomplete.

and of scientists who are militantly against religion:

the scientist who boomingly – and they always boom – declares that those who believe in the Deity are unavoidably crazy, "cracked" as my dear father would have said, although I should add that I have every reason to believe he was – and now hope is – on the side of the angels.

In March 2009 he was the opening speaker at the Biological Evolution: Facts and Theories conference held at the Pontifical Gregorian University in Rome, as well as chairing one of the sessions. The conference was sponsored by the Catholic Church. Conway Morris has contributed articles on evolution and Christian belief to several collections, including The Cambridge Companion to Science and Religion (2010) and The Blackwell Companion to Science and Christianity (2012).

{| class="wikitable"
|+ Simon Conway Morris appointments and accomplishments
|-
! Date || Position
|-
| 1969–1972 || University of Bristol: First Class Honours in Geology (BSc)
|-
| 1975 ||  	Elected Fellow (Title A) of St John's College 
|-
| 1976 ||	University of Cambridge: PhD
|-
| 1976 ||   Research Fellowship at St John's College, University of Cambridge
|-
| 1979 ||	Lecturer in Department of Earth Sciences, Open University
|-
| 1983 ||	Lecturer in Department of Earth Sciences, University of Cambridge
|-
| 1987–1988 ||	Awarded a One-Year Science Research Fellowship by the Nuffield Foundation
|-
| 1990 ||	Elected Fellow of the Royal Society
|-
| 1991 ||	Appointed Reader in Evolutionary Palaeobiology
|-
| 1995 ||	Elected to an ad hominem Chair in Evolutionary Palaeobiology
|-
| 1997–2002 || Natural Environment Research Council
|}

Awards and honours

The Walcott Medal 1987
PS Charles Schuchert Award 1989
GSL Charles Lyell Medal 1998
Trotter Prize 2007

Bibliography
 The Cambrian "Explosion" of Metazoans.  in Origination of Organismal Form: Beyond the Gene in Developmental and Evolutionary Biology 
 The Early Evolution of Metazoa and the Significance of Problematic Taxa. (ed., with Alberto M. Simonetta) Cambridge University Press, 1991. 
 
 
 The Deep Structure of Biology. (ed.) Templeton Foundation Press, 2008. 
 Fitness of the Cosmos for Life: Biochemistry and Fine-Tuning. (ed., with John D. Barrow, Stephen J. Freeland, Charles L. Harper, Jr.) Cambridge University Press, 2008. 
 Water and Life: The Unique Properties of H2O. (ed., with Ruth M. Lynden-Bell, John D. Barrow, John L. Finney, Charles Harper, Jr.) CRC Press, 2010. 
 The Runes of Evolution: How the Universe became Self-Aware. Templeton Press, 2015

See also 
Extraterrestrial (TV program) in which Conway Morris participates.

References

External links 

 Simon Conway Morris webpage at the Earth Sciences department, University of Cambridge
 Simon Conway Morris resource page at ISCAST
 Simon Conway Morris extended film interview with transcripts for the 'Why Are We Here?' documentary series.

1951 births
Living people
People educated at King's College School, London
Alumni of the University of Bristol
Fellows of St John's College, Cambridge
Academics of the Open University
English palaeontologists
Astrobiologists
British evolutionary biologists
Fellows of the Royal Society
English Christians
Charles Doolittle Walcott Medal winners
Lyell Medal winners
Theistic evolutionists